Maxburretia is a genus of three rare species of palms found in southern Thailand and Peninsular Malaysia.  The genus is named in honor of Max Burret, (1883 – 1964) a German botanist.

 Maxburretia furtadoana J.Dransf. - southern Thailand
 Maxburretia gracilis (Burret) J.Dransf - southern Thailand, Langkawi Islands
 Maxburretia rupicola (Ridl.) Furtado - Selangor

References

Coryphoideae
Flora of Thailand
Flora of Peninsular Malaysia
Arecaceae genera